Mujibul Haque Mujib (born 31 May 1947) is a Bangladeshi politician and the incumbent Jatiya Sangsad member representing  Comilla-11 constituency since 2009. He served as the Minister for Railways during 2012–2018.

Early life
Mujib was born on 31 May 1947 in Basuara village of 4th Sreepur Union under Chauddagram upazila of Comilla district. He completed his B.Com. degree from Comilla Victoria College in 1970.

Personal life
In October 2014, at the age of 67, Mujib married Honufa Akhter Rikta, a 36 year old. In May 2016, the couple became parents of a baby girl and two sons.

References

Living people
1947 births
Awami League politicians
Comilla Victoria Government College alumni
Railways ministers of Bangladesh
9th Jatiya Sangsad members
10th Jatiya Sangsad members
11th Jatiya Sangsad members